The Planning (Consequential Provisions) Act 1990 was an Act of Parliament in the United Kingdom to make provision for repeals, consequential amendments, transitional and transitory matters and savings in connection with the consolidation of enactments in the Town and Country Planning Act 1990, the Planning (Listed Buildings and Conservation Areas) Act 1990 and the Planning (Hazardous substances) Act 1990 (including provisions to give effect to recommendations of the Law Commission).

United Kingdom Acts of Parliament 1990
United Kingdom planning law